The Tribute Money is a 1612-1614 painting by Peter Paul Rubens, which has been in the Fine Arts Museum of San Francisco since 1944. It illustrates the Biblical account of Christ and the tribute money.

Sources
https://art.famsf.org/peter-paul-rubens/tribute-money-4411

Paintings depicting Jesus
1610s paintings
Paintings by Peter Paul Rubens
Paintings in the collection of the Fine Arts Museums of San Francisco